Emma Kendrick may refer to:

 Emma Eleonora Kendrick (1788–1871), British miniature-painter
 Emma Kendrick (academic), professor of energy materials